Goddess in the Doorway is the fourth solo album by Mick Jagger, released in 2001. The most recent offering from Jagger as a solo artist, it marked his first release with Virgin Records, who he has been contracted with as a member of The Rolling Stones since 1991.

Background
Following his 1993 album Wandering Spirit, and The Rolling Stones' Voodoo Lounge and Bridges to Babylon in 1994 and 1997, Jagger began to work on demo material in 2000, finally reaching the studio in the spring of 2001. Although Jagger would primarily work with Marti Frederiksen and Matt Clifford as producers, he also sanctioned the talents of Lenny Kravitz and Wyclef Jean to help create Goddess in the Doorway. And while the songs would largely be composed by Jagger, he endeavoured to work with other collaborators, namely, Kravitz and Rob Thomas, lead vocalist of Matchbox Twenty. The recording sessions of several of the album's tracks were featured in the documentary Being Mick. The Cover Photo was created by German fashion Designer Karl Lagerfeld.

Recording
While recording was underway, many of Jagger's musician friends, including Bono, Pete Townshend, Thomas, Kravitz, Jean and Joe Perry all made contributions. Townshend, in fact, was the initiating force behind the album. After having heard some of Jagger's demos, he told him that they didn't sound like Rolling Stones songs and that Jagger should record them on his own.

In the summer of 2001, Jagger had bumped into Missy Elliott and requested her to be part of the album. At his New York hotel, Jagger previewed his demo material to Elliott. Following their meeting, both Jagger's and Elliott's reps confirmed the two artists were slated to collaborate on the song, "Hide Away," however, due to scheduling conflicts their collaboration never saw the light of day. Jagger's collaborations with super-producer Rodney "Darkchild" Jerkins would suffer the same fate. By the end of the summer, Goddess in the Doorway was initially completed and the Kravitz-produced (and almost self-performed) "God Gave Me Everything" was put forward as the lead single that October. The song failed to become a significant hit.

Reception

Jann Wenner, chief editor for Rolling Stone magazine, bestowed a five-star instant classic rating upon the album, a score that The New Yorker noted as part of a general trend at the magazine, "an almost cynical way of preserving the critical legitimacy of classic-rock artists." Writing for the New York Daily News, Jim Farber said: "From the musicianship to the production to the performance and the lyrics, everything sounds cold and corporate." Keith Richards regularly referred to the album as Dogshit in the Doorway.

Goddess in the Doorway only reached No. 44 in the UK and No. 39 in the US It has sold 80,778 copies in the UK  and 317,000 copies in the US.

Following this, Jagger returned to work with The Rolling Stones on Forty Licks and A Bigger Bang and their respective worldwide tours labelled Licks and A Bigger Bang. Aside from his soundtrack work with David A. Stewart on Alfie in 2004, and the best of collection The Very Best of Mick Jagger released in 2007, Goddess in the Doorway remains his last solo release to date.

Track listing

Personnel
Mick Jagger – lead & backing vocals, acoustic & electric & slide guitar, harmonica, percussion
Bono – vocals on "Joy"
Mike Dolan, Milton McDonald – guitar
Marti Frederiksen – electric & acoustic guitar, drums, backing vocals, programming
Wyclef Jean – electric guitar, Spanish guitar on "Hide Away"
Lenny Kravitz – electric guitar, bass guitar, drums, tambourine, backing vocals on "God Gave Me Everything"
Kyle Cook – lead guitar on track 1
Joe Perry – guitar on "Everybody Getting High" & "Too Far Gone"
Craig Ross – twelve-string guitar, acoustic guitar
Pete Townshend – guitar on "Joy" & "Gun"
Jerry Duplessis, Phil Spalding, Christian Frederickson – bass guitar
Steve Knightley – cellomandolin
Robert Aaron – keyboards, French horn, flute
Matt Clifford – piano, Hammond organ B3, Fender Rhodes, mellotron, keyboards, synthesizer, backing vocals, programming
Kenny Aronoff, Jim Keltner, Ian Thomas – drums
Lenny Castro, Paul Clarvis – percussion
Martin Heyes – programming
Chris White – tenor saxophone
Patsy Gamble - baritone saxophone
Steve Sidwell – trumpet
Mikal Reid – trumpet, programming
Neil Sidwell – trombone
Pamela Quinlan - piano, keyboards - backing vocals
Rob Thomas – backing vocals on "Visions of Paradise"
Ruby Turner – backing vocals
Elizabeth Jagger – backing vocals on "Brand New Set of Rules"
Georgia May Jagger – backing vocals on "Brand New Set of Rules"

Charts

Weekly charts

Certifications and sales

References

2001 albums
Mick Jagger albums
Albums produced by Lenny Kravitz
Albums produced by Marti Frederiksen
Albums produced by Mick Jagger
Virgin Records albums